The Korail Class 210000, also known as the EMU-150, is a South Korean higher-speed electrical multiple unit train manufactured by Hyundai Rotem and Woojin Industrial System Company Limited and operated by Korail on ITX-Saemaeul services since 2014.

History
In July 2011, Hyundai-Rotem and Korail signed an agreement for an order of 24 six-car units, with deliveries in 2013.

On 15 October 2013, the first set was delivered to Korail.

The EMU-150 entered service in 2014 on ITX-Saemaeul limited-express services.

In 2018, a further order of 34 sets - 27 of which would be four-car sets and 7 of which would be six-car sets - was placed with Woojin Industrial System Company Limited. The first sets are expected to be delivered in 2021.

Fleet list

, the fleet is as follows:

See also

 List of high speed trains
 Rail transport in South Korea

References

Korail
Rolling stock of South Korea
Electric multiple units of South Korea

Hyundai Rotem multiple units
25 kV AC multiple units